The Neck Road station (formerly Gravesend Neck Road station) is a local station on the BMT Brighton Line of the New York City Subway. It is located at Gravesend Neck Road between East 15th and East 16th Streets in Homecrest, Brooklyn. The station is served by the Q train at all times.

History 
This station opened on August 23, 1907. This station underwent reconstruction from December 2008 to January 2010. Both platforms were rebuilt with new windscreens, canopies, and tactile strip edges. A temporary platform over the express tracks was used to provide service on the side that was under rebuilding. In 2010, the foundation of the LIRR station was excavated to street grade to allow expansion of the station house and installation of the Manhattan-bound platform staircase. The retaining wall and staircase facing Gravesend Neck Road remain intact. Construction continued in 2011 with a mural installation along the southbound platform staircase, and preparation of retail space for newsstand occupancy.

Station layout

This station has two side platforms and four tracks. The center tracks are used by the B express train when it operates on weekdays. Like the rest of the Brighton Line between Avenue H and Sheepshead Bay, it is situated on an embankment.

Both platforms have beige windscreens with green outlines and frames along their entire lengths and red canopies with green frames in the center. The station signs are in the standard black plates in white lettering and lamp posts are on all support columns of the windscreens in the non-canopied areas. The Coney Island-bound platform has a storage area above the mezzanine staircase.

To the east of this station are the remains of a station on the former Manhattan Beach Branch of the Long Island Rail Road, also named Neck Road. Until the mid-1920s, this line ran parallel to the Brighton Line from just south of Avenue H, where it branched off from the LIRR's Bay Ridge Branch, to Sheepshead Bay, where it diverged east to Manhattan Beach, Brooklyn. While much of the Manhattan Beach right-of-way has been built over, the station foundation and staircases remain. The station had two tracks and two side platforms. A spur also branched off just south of Neck Road and crossed towards the now-razed Sheepshead Bay Race Track.

Exit
The station has one ground-level station house directly underneath the tracks and platforms on the north side of Neck Road. It has a token booth, a single standard MetroCard vending machine, small turnstile bank, two gates, and a double-wide staircase to each platform. Both staircase landings have two full height turnstiles leading directly to the sidewalk. The ones on the Coney Island-bound side are exit-only while the Manhattan-bound side has one for exit-only and another for entry and exit.

In popular culture
This station served as part of the backdrop for a few scenes in the 1993 film A Bronx Tale, starring Robert De Niro and Chazz Palminteri.

References

External links 
 
 
 Station Reporter — Q Train
 ARRT's Archives — Manhattan Beach Branch — Neck Road Station
 The Subway Nut — Neck Road Pictures
 Entrance from Google Maps Street View
 Platforms from Google Maps Street View

BMT Brighton Line stations
New York City Subway stations in Brooklyn
Railway stations in the United States opened in 1907
1907 establishments in New York City
Sheepshead Bay, Brooklyn